Aquila is the genus of true eagles. The genus name is Latin  for "eagle", possibly derived from aquilus, "dark in colour". It is often united with the buteos, sea eagles, and other more heavyset Accipitridae, but more recently they appear to be less distinct from the more slender accipitrine hawks than previously believed. Eagles are not a natural group, but denote essentially any bird of prey large enough to hunt sizeable (about 50 cm long or more overall) vertebrate prey.

Taxonomy and systematics
The genus Aquila was introduced by the French zoologist Mathurin Jacques Brisson in 1760 with the golden eagle (Aquila chrysaetos) as the type species. Aquila belongs to a close-knit group of "typical" eagles including genera Hieraaetus, Lophaetus, Ictinaetus and Clanga. This group occurs as a clade within the larger group of "booted" eagles (tribe Aquilini or subfamily Aquilinae).

The plumage of the more basal members of the booted-eagle group, such as Spizaetus and Nisaetus, generally has barred underparts in adults, and is distinctly different in juveniles which have plain, pale underparts.  In contrast, within the Aquila–Hieraaetus–Lophaetus clade, adults are generally dark, with juveniles more closely resembling the adults.  Hieraaetus species have both dark and light (or "pied") morphs, with the latter having light, unbarred under-parts.

Research in molecular genetics found Aquila and Hieraaetus to be polyphyletic.  Between 2005 and 2014, the British Ornithologists' Union included both Bonelli's and the booted eagle in Aquila.  Also, Clements' Checklist merged all Hieraetus species into Aquila from 2001 to 2009.  The current approach is to keep Hieraaetus as a separate genus, with Bonelli's eagle and the African hawk-eagle moved into Aquila and Wahlberg's eagle moved into Hieraaetus.

The spotted eagles  greater spotted eagle, lesser spotted eagle, and Indian spotted eagle (previously Aquila clanga, A. pomarina, A. (p.) hastata) are thought to be genetically closer to Ictinaetus and Lophoaetus than to other Aquila species, and may be placed into a separate genus, Clanga.

Members of Aquila (excluding those moved to Clanga and Hieraaetus, but including A. fasciata/spilogaster) share two deletions in the (nuclear) LDH gene, as well as similarities in mitochondrial cyt-B gene sequence, though one of these deletions is reverted in A. chrysaetos.

Species
The genus Aquila contains 11 species:

Fossil record
Numerous fossil taxa of eagles have been described. Many have been moved to other genera, but several appear to be correctly assigned to this genus:

Aquila bullockensis (Middle Miocene)
?Aquila delphinensis (Middle/Late Miocene of Grive-Saint-Alban, France)
?Aquila pennatoides (Middle/Late Miocene of Grive-Saint-Alban, France)
Aquila sp. (Late Miocene – Late Pliocene of S Europe)
Aquila sp. (Early Pliocene of Florida)
Aquila bivia (Late Pliocene of S USA)
Aquila kurochkini (Late Pliocene of Varshets, Bulgaria)
Aquila sp. (Middle Pleistocene of Castiglione, Corsica)
?Aquila fossilis (Middle/Late Pleistocene of Monte Reale, Sardinia)
Aquila nipaloides (Pleistocene of Sardinia and Corsica)
 ?Aquila sp. (Late Quaternary, Madagascar)

Whether "Hieraaetus" edwardsi (Middle -? Late Miocene of SW Europe) belongs into Aquila or the hawk-eagles (if the latter are indeed distinct) is unclear. Its initial name, "Aquila" minuta Milne-Edwards, 1871, is preoccupied by a junior synonym of the booted eagle, A. minuta Brehm, 1831.

Not placed in Aquila anymore are:
 "Aquila" gervaisii – now in Palaeohierax
 "Aquila" borrasi, "A." sodalis – now in Buteogallus, B. borrasi was long placed in Titanohierax.
 "Aquila" pliogryps – now in Spizaetus
 "Aquila" corroyi, "A." depredator, "A." hypogaea, and "A." prisca – now in Aquilavus
 "Aquila" ferox, "A." lydekkeri – protostrigid owls, now in Minerva.

"Aquila" danana (Snake Creek Late Miocene/Early Pliocene of Loup Fork, USA), occasionally placed in Geranoaetus or Buteo, was a bird of prey of unclear relationships.

Notes

References

External links 
 

 
Webarchive template webcite links
Bird genera